Georges Ginesta (born July 8, 1942 in Saint-Raphaël, Var) is a former member of the National Assembly of France.  He represented the Var department,  as a member of the Union for a Popular Movement.

References

1942 births
Living people
People from Saint-Raphaël, Var
Union for a Popular Movement politicians
Deputies of the 12th National Assembly of the French Fifth Republic
Deputies of the 13th National Assembly of the French Fifth Republic
Deputies of the 14th National Assembly of the French Fifth Republic
Senators of Var (department)